is an interchange passenger railway station in located in the city of Yao,  Osaka Prefecture, Japan, operated by the private railway operator Kintetsu Railway.

Lines
Kawachi-Yamamoto Station is served by the Osaka Line, and is located 11.1 rail kilometers from the starting point of the line at Ōsaka Uehommachi Station. It is also the terminus of the 2.8 kilometer Shiki Line to Shigisanguchi Station.

Station layout
The station consists of two elevated opposed side platforms with the station building underneath. The ticket gate is only one place. The length of the platform is 6 cars (120 meter)

Layout
Kawachi-Yamamoto Station has a side platform serving Track 5 in the north, and two island platforms serving Tracks 1, 2, 3 and 4 in the south, all connected by an elevated station building.

Platforms

Adjacent stations

History

Passenger statistics
In fiscal 2018, the station was used by an average of 20,281 passengers daily.

Surrounding area
North side
Yao City Yamamoto Office, Yamamoto Library, Yamamoto Community Center
Yamamoto Hachimangu
Osaka University of Economics and Law Yamamoto House (school bus stop)
South side
Tamakushi River

Buses
Yamamoto-ekimae (Kintetsu Bus Co., Ltd.)
Bus stop 1 (Yamamoto Route)
Route 90 for  via Aobacho and Tamakushi
Route 91 for Tamakushi via Aobacho
Route 92 for Takasago Housing via Aobacho
Bus stop 3
Route 20 (Onji Route) for  via Kamiocho and Gakuonji

See also
List of railway stations in Japan

References

External links

 Kawachi-Yamamoto Station 

Railway stations in Japan opened in 1925
Railway stations in Osaka Prefecture
Yao, Osaka